The Ottoman Empire competed at the 1906 Intercalated Games in Athens, Greece. One male athlete competed in two events in one sport and a football team participated for Smyrna. This team won the silver medal in football event.

Athletics

Track

Football

The matches of the team Smyrna:

References

Nations at the 1906 Intercalated Games
1906
Intercalated Games